The Mount Gambier Football Club was an Australian rules football club established in the city of Mount Gambier, South Australia on the 31 August 1876. The club dissolved around 1897.

Rules 
The following is an extract from the announcement from Mount Gambier's 'Boarder Watch' newspaper:

References 

Australian rules football clubs established in 1876
Australian rules football clubs in South Australia
1876 establishments in Australia